Josta was a soft drink brand that was produced by PepsiCo and the first energy drink ever introduced by a major US beverage company. It was marketed as a "high-energy drink" with guarana and caffeine.

Josta was introduced in 1995, but PepsiCo pulled the drink from its lineup due to a change in corporate strategy in 1999. Shortly before the beverage was discontinued, an "Association for Josta Saving" was started. A "Save Josta" campaign was also launched by fans of the drink; their website "www.savejosta.org" was defunct for several years but was reactivated in 2011.

Advertising
Josta used the slogan, "better do the good stuff now." In a commercial for Josta, an old man speaks to a younger man; the older man tells the younger man about his life as a youth, and how he wished he had more fun.

Popular culture
A Josta drink appear in the 2021 Disney+ series Loki.

An advertising poster for Josta appears in Madison Square Garden in the 1998 film Godzilla.

References

PepsiCo soft drinks
Energy drinks
American soft drinks
Products introduced in 1995
Defunct brands
Guarana sodas